C struct data types may end with a flexible array member with no specified size:

struct vectord {
    short len;    // there must be at least one other data member
    double arr[]; // the flexible array member must be last
    // The compiler may reserve extra padding space here, like it can between struct members
};

Typically, such structures serve as the header in a larger, variable memory allocation:

struct vectord *vector = malloc(...);
vector->len = ...;
for (int i = 0; i < vector->len; i++)
     vector->arr[i] = ...;  // transparently uses the right type (double)

Effect on struct size and padding 

The sizeof operator on such a struct gives the size of the structure as if the flexible array member were empty. This may include padding added to accommodate the flexible member; the compiler is also free to re-use such padding as part of the array itself. 

It is common to allocate sizeof(struct) + array_len*sizeof(array element) bytes. 

This is not wrong, but it may allocate a few more bytes than necessary: the compiler may be re-purposing some of the padding that is included in sizeof(struct). Should this be a concern, macros are available to compute the minimum size while ensuring that the compiler's padding is not disrupted. 

As the array may start in the padding before the end of the structure, its content should always be accessed via indexing (arr[i]) or  offsetof, not sizeof.

Availability 

Flexible array members were officially standardized in C99. In practice, compilers (e.g., GCC, Microsoft's) provided them well before C99 was standardized.

Flexible array members are not officially part of C++, but language extensions are widely available.

References 

C (programming language)
Arrays